A Lourdes grotto is a replica of the grotto where the Lourdes apparitions occurred in 1858, in the town of Lourdes in France, now part of the sanctuary of Our Lady of Lourdes. Some Lourdes grottos are almost identical reproductions of the scene of the apparitions, with statues of Our Lady of Lourdes and Bernadette Soubirous in a natural or artificial cave, while others may differ from the original in size, shape or style.

Notable Lourdes grottoes

North America

Our Lady of Lourdes Grotto, Flatrock, Newfoundland and Labrador
 Grotto of Our Lady of Lourdes, Rama, Saskatchewan
 Our Lady of Lourdes Grotto, Vanier, Ottawa, Ontario 
 Saint Anthony Hermitage, Lac-Bouchette, Quebec



Colorado
 The Grotto (1929–1959), Mother Cabrini Shrine, Golden, Colorado

Connecticut
 Shrine to Our Lady of Lourdes, Litchfield, Connecticut

Florida
 Basilica of St. Mary Star of the Sea, Key West, Florida

Illinois
 Lourdes Grotto, Annunciation Church, Aurora, Illinois
 Lourdes Grotto, National Shrine of Our Lady of the Snows, Belleville, Illinois
 Shrine to Our Lady of Lourdes, St. Mary Oratory, Rockford, Illinois
 Dominican University Shrine to Our Lady of Lourdes (the Grotto), River Forest, Illinois

Indiana
 Grotto of Our Lady of Lourdes, Notre Dame, University of Notre Dame, Notre Dame, Indiana
 Saint Joseph's College, Rensselaer, Indiana
 Grotto of Our Lady of Lourdes, National Shrine of Our Lady of Providence, Saint Mary-of-the-Woods, Indiana

Kentucky
 Lourdes Rosary Shrine, Church of St. Louis Bertrand, Louisville, Kentucky

Louisiana
 The Grotto of the Holy Mother (1870s), St. Martin of Tours Catholic Church (St. Martinville, Louisiana)
Lourdes Grotto, St. Michel de Cantrelle Church Convent, Louisiana
 Our Lady of Lourdes Grotto, New Iberia, Louisiana
 Lourdes Grotto, St. Ann Shrine, New Orleans, Louisiana

Maine
 Grotto of Our Lady of Lourdes, St. Anthony's Franciscan Monastery, Kennebunkport, Maine

Maryland
 Shrine of St. Anthony, Ellicott City, Maryland
 National Shrine Grotto of Our Lady of Lourdes, Emmitsburg, Maryland

Massachusetts
 Grotto of Our Lady of Lourdes, Stonehill College, Easton, Massachusetts
 Grotto of Our Lady of Lourdes, Franco-American School, Lowell, Massachusetts
 Lourdes Grotto, National Shrine of The Divine Mercy (Stockbridge, Massachusetts), Stockbridge, Massachusetts

Michigan
 Assumption of the Blessed Virgin Mary Church, Detroit, Michigan
 St. Mary's Catholic Church, Detroit, Michigan
 Orchard Lake Schools, Orchard Lake, Michigan
 Our Lady of Good Counsel Catholic Church, Plymouth, Michigan

New Mexico
 Our Lady of Lourdes Grotto, Los Ojos, New Mexico

New York
 Lourdes Grotto, College of Mount Saint Vincent, Bronx, New York
 Our Lady of Lourdes Grotto, St. Lucy's Church, Bronx, New York
 Grotto Shrine of Our Lady of Lourdes (1898–2015), Our Lady of Lourdes Church, Brooklyn, New York
 Shrine of Our Lady of Lourdes, Holy Family Church, Fairmount, New York
 Shrine of Our Lady of Lourdes, Immaculate Conception Church, New Lebanon, New York
 Our Lady of Lourdes Grotto, St. Cabrini Home, West Park, New York

North Carolina
 Grotto of Our Lady of Lourdes, Belmont Abbey, North Carolina

Ohio
 Our Lady of Lourdes Grotto, Central Catholic High School, Canton, Ohio
 Our Lady of Lourdes Grotto, Mount Saint John, Dayton, Ohio
 Our Lady of Lourdes National Shrine, Euclid, Ohio
 Lourdes Grotto, Our Lady of the Pines, Fremont, Ohio
 Our Lady of Lourdes Grotto and Church, Genoa, Ohio
 Our Lady of Lourdes Shrine, St. Joseph Catholic Church, Mogadore, Ohio

Texas
 Our Lady of Lourdes Grotto of the Southwest, Oblate Missions, San Antonio, Texas

Wisconsin
 St. Francis de Sales Seminary, St. Francis, Wisconsin

South America

Grotto of Lourdes, San Pedro de Colalao, Tucumán Province

Grotto of Lourdes, Basilica of Lourdes, Santiago

National Shrine of the Grotto of Lourdes, Church of the Savior, Montevideo, Uruguay

Asia-Pacific

Our Lady of Lourdes Shrine, Villianur, Puducherry
 Immaculate Conception Cathedral, Pondicherry
 St. Andrew's Church, Puducherry
 St. Theresa Church, Perambur

Grotto of Lourdes, St. Mary's Cathedral, Tokyo

Our Lady of Lourdes Grotto, Baguio, Benguet
 Our Lady of Lourdes Grotto Shrine, San Jose del Monte, Bulacan
 Our Lady of Lourdes Grotto, Cotabato City, Mindanao

Shrine of Our Lady of Lourdes, Guanxi Township

Europe

Our Lady of Lourdes Grotto, Heiligenkreuz

Lourdesgrot, Humbeek
 Oostakker Basilica, Slotendries

Saint Ignatius Church, Dubrovnik

Church of St. John, Cratloe, Cratloe, County Clare

Kretinga Lourdes Grotto, Kretinga

Lourdes Grotto, Sereo Preto, Aruba
 Lourdes Grotto (Lourdesgrot), Scheveningen, The Hague
 Lourdesgrot, Sint Nicolaasga, Friesland

Carfin Grotto, Carfin, Scotland
 Lourdes Grotto, Cleator

Grotta di Lourdes, Gardens of Vatican City

References

See also 
 Lourdes apparitions
 Our Lady of Lourdes
 Sanctuary of Our Lady of Lourdes

Our Lady of Lourdes
Shrines to the Virgin Mary